Cathy Jordan (born in Scramogue, County Roscommon in 1972) is a singer, songwriter, and multi-instrumentalist, playing guitar, bodhran, bones and bouzouki. She has been the lead vocalist for the traditional Irish music band Dervish since 1991, and is a solo performer as well.
Jordan is also a member of the group The Unwanted. Her first solo album, entitled All the Way Home, was released in January, 2012.

Discography

With Dervish

 Harmony Hill
 Playing with Fire
 At the End of the Day
 Live in Palma
 Midsummer's Night
 Decade
 Spirit
 Healing Heart
 Travelling Show

With The Unwanted
 Music from the Atlantic Fringe (2010)

Solo
 All the Way Home (2012)

References

External links

 Dervish

Irish women singer-songwriters
Living people
People from County Roscommon
1972 births